"Down Home" is a song by American country music singer Jimmie Allen. It was released on March 14, 2022 as the lead single from his third studio album Tulip Drive. Allen co-wrote the song with Rian Ball, Cameron Bedell, and Tate Howell, and co-produced with Ash Bowers.

Content
The song is a tribute to Allen's father, who died in 2019. Allen shot the video at his childhood house. He co-wrote the song during a session with Rian Ball, Cameron Bedell, and Tate Howell, the last of whom is the guitarist in Allen's touring band. Allen said that he often found himself becoming emotional when recording the song, and continued to feel that way in concert. In particular, he cited the line "I got a daughter now" as being a point where he often found difficulty continuing to sing the song in a live setting, as Allen's father never met his daughters.

Charts

Weekly charts

Year-end charts

References

2022 singles
2022 songs
Jimmie Allen songs
BBR Music Group singles